French Creek is a  northward-flowing tributary of the Upper Iowa River, near the latter's confluence with the Mississippi River.  It is located in French Creek Township, Allamakee County, Iowa.

Confluence with Upper Iowa River:

See also
List of rivers of Iowa

References

Rivers of Allamakee County, Iowa
Rivers of Iowa